In the calculus of variations, a subfield of mathematics, quasiconvexity is a generalisation of the notion of convexity. It is used to characterise the integrand of a functional and related to the existence of minimisers. Under some natural conditions, quasiconvexity of the integrand is a necessary and sufficient condition for a functional

to be lower semi-continuous in the weak topology, for a sufficient regular domain . By compactness arguments (Banach–Alaoglu theorem) the existence of minimisers of weakly lower semicontinuous functionals may then follow from the direct method.
This concept was introduced by Morrey in 1952. This generalisation should not be confused with the same concept of a quasiconvex function which has the same name.

Definition
A locally bounded Borel-measurable function  is called quasiconvex if

Properties of quasiconvex functions
The domain  can be replaced by any other bounded Lipschitz domain.

Quasiconvex functions are locally Lipschitz-continuous.

In the definition the space  can be replaced by periodic Sobolev functions.

Relations to other notions of convexity
. The Riesz-Markov-Kakutani representation theorem states that the dual space of  can be identified with the space of signed, finite Radon measures on it. We define a Radon measure   by

It can be verfied that  is a
probability measure and its barycenter is given

If  is a convex function, then Jensens' Inequality gives

The determinant  is an example of a quasiconvex function, which is not convex. To see that the determinant is not convex, consider

It then holds  but for  we have
. This shows that the determinant is not a quasiconvex function like in Game Theory and thus a distinct notion of convexity.

In the vectorial case of the Calculus of Variations there are other notions of convexity. For a function  it holds that 

Already in 1952, Morrey conjectured that rank-1-convexity does not imply quasiconvexity.

Relation to weak lower semi-continuity
Under certain growth condition of the integrand, the sequential weakly lower semi-continuity (swlsc) of an integral functional in an appropriate Sobolev space is equivalent to the quasiconvexity of the integrand. Acerbi and Fusco proved the following theorem:

Theorem: If  is Carathéodory function and
it holds . Then the functional

is swlsc in the Sobolev Space  with   if and only if  is quasiconvex. Here  is a positive constant and  an integrable function.

Other authors use different growth conditions and different proof conditions. The first proof of it was due to Morrey in his paper, but he required additional assumptions.

References 

Calculus of variations